The 1941 Case Rough Riders football team represented the Case School of Applied Science in the American city of Cleveland, Ohio, now a part of Case Western Reserve University, during the 1941 college football season.  The team was coached by Ray A. Ride, for whom the team mascot was named.   The Case–Reserve rivalry game saw its 50th matchup, which began in 1891.

Schedule

References

Case
Case Western Reserve Spartans football seasons
Case Rough Riders football